Kateryna Bondarenko was the defending champion, but chose not to participate.

Margarita Gasparyan won the title, defeating qualifier and compatriot Anastasia Potapova in the final 6–2, 6–1. Ranked at World No. 299, Gasparyan became the third-lowest ranked player ever to win a WTA singles title.

Seeds

Draw

Finals

Top half

Bottom half

Qualifying

Seeds

Qualifiers

Qualifying draw

First qualifier

Second qualifier

Third qualifier

Fourth qualifier

References
Main Draw
Qualifying Draw

2018 WTA Tour
Singles